Sonia Balani is Indian actress and model known for her roles in Bollywood films Tum Bin 2 and Baazaar as well as television shows Bade Achhe Lagte Hain,   Tu Mera Hero and Detective Didi.

Filmography

Films 
Tum Bin II (2016) as Gurpreet
Baazaar (2018) as Amna Ahmed

Television 
 Bade Achhe Lagte Hain  (Sony Entertainment Channel) as Peehu Kapoor Shergil 
 Suvreen Guggal – Topper of The Year (Channel V) as Sony Chada 
 Tu Mera Hero  (Star Plus) as Panchi Titu Agrawal 
 Detective Didi  (Zee TV) as Detective Bunty Sharma

Web series 
 Bhopal to Vegas  (Disney+ Hotstar)

References

External links 

1991 births
Living people
Indian film actresses
Indian female models
Indian television actresses
21st-century Indian actresses